Santa and the Ice Cream Bunny is a 1972 American musical fantasy film written, composed, shot, edited and directed by Richard Winer to frame Barry Mahon's Childhood Productions films for a Christmas release. The threadbare plot concerns Santa Claus' attempts to free his sleigh from the sands of a Florida beach, assisted by local children.

Different prints feature one of two films-within-the-film (that take up a majority of the film itself). They are Mahon's previously filmed 1970 adaptations of Hans Christian Andersen's Thumbelina or Benjamin Tabart's Jack and the Beanstalk.

Atrocious acting, cheap production values and a meandering long running time have earned a fan following as one of the worst Christmas movies ever made.

Plot
A few days before Christmas, in Santa's workshop at the North Pole, Santa's elves lament (via song) about how they make toys while Santa is away. Santa's reindeer return, but without Santa or his sleigh, prompting the elves to wonder (again in song) what has happened to Santa. Meanwhile, Santa has crash-landed on a beach in Dania Beach, Florida, gotten his sleigh stuck in the sand and been abandoned by his reindeer. Santa sings, bemoaning his troubles, then falls asleep.

In his sleep, Santa telepathically summons several local children, who run to him and offer to help. Santa explains that they must find a way to pull his sleigh from the sand, as he cannot abandon it. The kids bring Santa several animals to pull the sleigh, including a horse, a donkey, a cow, a sheep, a pig and a gorilla (really a man in a gorilla suit).

Meanwhile, Tom Sawyer and Huckleberry Finn watch and comment on the action from a distance.

When all attempts fail, Santa encourages them not to give up hope, and begins to tell them the story of Thumbelina as an example. The film then cuts away to instead show Barry Mahon's previously produced film version of Thumbelina, in which a girl visits the now-defunct theme park Pirates World, hears the story in a Hans Christian Andersen attraction, and imagines herself as the title character. The Mahon film plays in its entirety, complete with its original credits sequence, and runs twice as long as the frame narrative (alternate prints use another Mahon fairy tale adaptation, Jack and the Beanstalk, as Santa's story).

Afterwards, Santa again encourages the children to "always believe" and they go off to find help. Santa takes off his coat and again falls asleep. He wakes up to the sound of an antique fire engine, which is being driven by the titular Ice Cream Bunny, whom the children's dog Rebel has summoned. The Ice Cream Bunny drives the children through Pirates World to the beach. Santa puts on his coat to prepare to meet them. He thanks the children for their help and accepts the Ice Cream Bunny's offer to drive him back to the North Pole. Santa reminds the children one last time to always have faith as they depart.

The children realize that Santa's sleigh is still stuck in the sand. As they wonder what to do, the sleigh abruptly teleports to the North Pole, where it will lie in wait for Santa's return.

Cast

 Jay Ripley, credited as Jay Clark, as Santa Claus
 Charlie and David as fighting kids
 Kathy as skateboard girl
 Mike as skateboard donkey boy
 Kim Nicholas as donkey girl / doll elf
 Robin as Rebel's owner
 Sandy as boy jumping off roof
 Scotty as batter
 Steve as catcher

Thumbelina
 Shay Garner as Thumbelina
 Pat Morrell as Mrs. Mole
 Bob O'Connell as Mr. Mole
 Ruth McMahon as mother
 Heather Grinter as the witch
 Sue Cable as flower girl
 Mike Yuenger as flower prince

Jack and the Beanstalk
 Mitchell Poulos as Jack
 Dorothy Stokes as Jack's mother
 Renato Boracherro as the giant
 Chris Brooks as Honest John
 John Loomis
 Sami Sims
 George Wadsworth

Rifftrax
On December 17, 2010, RiffTrax released Santa and the Ice Cream Bunny, with their synchronous commentary, as a "Video on Demand" download. It has since been made available on DVD as well by Legend Films as well as an extended in-studio edition.

On December 3, 2015, RiffTrax presented a live screening of Santa and the Ice Cream Bunny in theaters across the United States. For this performance, the alternate Jack and the Beanstalk version was used. It is considered one of their popular titles.

Home media
The Thumbelina version was released on VHS by United Home Video, but is different from the theatrical version in that the film Thumbelina is shown after the Santa portion, rather than during it.

The Jack and the Beanstalk version has not been released on video, but the included film was released on DVD by Image Entertainment in 2002.

It was also part of Weird Christmas on Fandor.

See also
 List of American films of 1972
 List of Christmas films
 Santa Claus in film
 List of films considered the worst

References

External links
 
 
 RiffTrax's treatment of the Thumbelina version on official YouTube channel
 Excerpt

1972 films
1970s Christmas films
1972 independent films
1970s musical fantasy films
American children's fantasy films
American Christmas films
American independent films
American musical fantasy films
1970s English-language films
Films about rabbits and hares
Films based on Thumbelina
Films based on Jack and the Beanstalk
Films set in amusement parks
Films set in Florida
Films shot in Florida
Santa Claus in film
1970s rediscovered films
Rediscovered American films
1970s American films